Syeda Zohra Alauddin is a Bangladesh Awami League politician and a Member of Parliament from a reserved seat.

Early life and education
Syeda Zohra Alauddin was born in the Kazirgaon area of Moulvibazar to a Bengali Muslim mother, Fatimah Khatun Chowdhury. Zohra graduated from the University of Dhaka with a degree in political science. She married Muhammad Alauddin Chowdhury, an ex-freedom fighter of the Bangladesh Liberation War.

Career
Zohra was elected to parliament from reserved seat as a Bangladesh Awami League candidate in 2019. She is the woman's secretary of the Moulvibazar District unit of Bangladesh Awami League.

References

Awami League politicians
Living people
Women members of the Jatiya Sangsad
11th Jatiya Sangsad members
21st-century Bangladeshi women politicians
21st-century Bangladeshi politicians
People from Moulvibazar District
1953 births
Bangladeshi people of Arab descent